The 1980–81 Illinois State Redbirds men's basketball team represented Illinois State University during the 1980–81 NCAA Division I men's basketball season. The Redbirds, led by third year head coach Bob Donewald, played their home games at Horton Field House and competed as an independent (not a member of a conference). They finished the season 16–11.

Roster

Schedule

|-
!colspan=9 style=|Exhibition Season

|-
!colspan=9 style=|Regular Season

References

Illinois State Redbirds men's basketball seasons
Illinois State
Illinois State Redbirds Men's Basketball
Illinois State Redbirds Men's Basketball